The 15th Massachusetts Regiment was raised on September 16, 1776, under Colonel Timothy Bigelow at Boston, Massachusetts, as part of Massachusetts contribution to the Resolve of 88 Regiments. The regiment would see action at the Battle of Saratoga, Battle of Monmouth and the Battle of Rhode Island. The regiment was disbanded on January 1, 1781, at West Point, New York.

References 

Wright, Robert K. The Continental Army. Washington, D.C.: United States Army Center of Military History, 1983. Available online

External links
Bibliography of the Continental Army in Massachusetts compiled by the United States Army Center of Military History

15th Massachusetts Regiment
Military units and formations established in 1776
Military units and formations disestablished in 1781